The Brașov Running Festival is an annual road-based 10K run hosted by Brașov, Romania, since 2021.  The race is a World Athletics Elite Label Road Race.  A 5K run is also offered earlier in the day.

In both 2021 and 2022, both the male and female Romanian 10K all-comers records were broken.

History 

The 10K was won by Kenyan runners Peter Mwaniki Aila and Nelly Jepchumba, with finish times of 28:39 and 32:11, respectively. Both victors had set new Romanian 10K all-comers records, with Alia's performance being considered amongst the top 50 in the world at the time, and Jepchumba's amongst the top 30.

Kenyan runners Nicholas Kimeli and Sheila Chepkirui won the 10K, with finish times of 26:51 and 30:07, respectively. Kimeli's time established him as the fifth-fastest 10K runner ever, and Chepkirui missed breaking the women-only 10K world record by six seconds.

Course 

All the races use the same finish line, but their starting points vary depending on the length of the race.

The 10K begins on Camil Petrescu Street. Runners first head east before turning onto a minor path parallel to Camil Petrescu Street. After about 150 m (500 ft) on that path, racers make a sharp left turn onto Zaharia Stancu Street. After passing by the largest shopping mall in Transylvania, the course turns left onto 13 December Street and heads south for about 300 m (1000 ft) before turning left again, back onto Camil Petrescu Street, to complete the loop. Runners of the 10K complete just under three of these loops, finishing on Camil Petrescu Street slightly west of where they started.

Winners 

Key: Course record (in bold)

See also 
 Bucharest Marathon

Notes

References

External links 
 Official website

10K runs
2021 establishments in Romania
Annual sporting events in Romania
Autumn events in Romania
September sporting events
Sport in Brașov
Recurring sporting events established in 2021
Road running competitions in Romania